This is a list of all men's hosts in FIS Alpine Ski World Cup from 1967 to present. The list includes all individual World Cup disciplines: downhill, super-G, giant slalom, slalom, Classic/Super/Alpine combined, parallel slalom and parallel giant slalom.

Since 2006 mixed team events are on schedule also. Sixteen parallel slalom events in total which counted for Nations Cup only, were held between 1976 and 1991.

List of men's world cup hosts

Individual World Cup hosts

after SL in Soldeu (19 March 2023)

after SL in Soldeu (19 March 2023)

Parallel slalom hosts for Nations Cup ranking only
16 events — Saalbach (2), Mont St. Anne (1), Sierra Nevada (1), Arosa (1), Madonna di Campiglio (1), Laax (1), Montgenèvre (1), Furano (1), Oslo (1), Vienna (1), Bromont (1), Berlin (1), Bormio (1), Saalbach (1), Waterville (1)

Mixed team hosts
17 events — Lenzerheide (5), Åre (3), Méribel (2), Soldeu (2), Aspen (1), Garmisch-Partenkirchen (1), Innsbruck (1), St. Moritz (1),  Schladming (1)

Footnotes

References

External links
FIS-ski.com – official results for FIS alpine World Cup events

Men's hosts